American Splendor , formerly America is an overnight riverboat built by Chesapeake Shipbuilding in Salisbury, Maryland for American Cruise Lines (ACL) for overnight river cruising on the Mississippi, Ohio, Tennessee, and Cumberland rivers in the United States.  American Slpendor replaced paddlewheeler American Pride  on the Mississippi River in 2016 when that ship was repositioned to the Columbia River.  According to American Cruise lines, American Splendor will have "features never seen before on a riverboat". American Splendor is slightly larger than previous ACL riverboats with a 185-passenger capacity.  The ship's hull was launched on August 7, 2015 and moved to a basin where construction of the upper decks and outfitting will take place.

References

External links
 Official website

2015 ships
Cruise ships of the United States
Ships built in Salisbury, Maryland